The 200th New York State Legislature, consisting of the New York State Senate and the New York State Assembly, met from January 9, 2013, to December 31, 2014, during the third and fourth years of Andrew Cuomo's governorship, in Albany

Sessions
Governor Cuomo chose not to call any special elections for seats in the Legislature in 2014, so that for most of the year 11 seats in the Assembly and 2 seats in the Senate remained vacant.

State Senate

Senators
The asterisk (*) denotes members of the previous Legislature who continued in office as members of this Legislature. Phil Boyle, George Latimer and George A. Amedore Jr. changed from the Assembly to the Senate.

Note: For brevity, the chairmanships omit the words "...the Committee on (the)..."

Employees
 Secretary: ?

State Assembly

Assembly members
The asterisk (*) denotes members of the previous Legislature who continued in office as members of this Legislature.

Note: For brevity, the chairmanships omit the words "...the Committee on (the)..."

Employees
 Clerk: ?

Notes

References

Sources
 Senate election results at NYS Board of Elections
 Assembly election results at NYS Board of Elections
 Assembly special election results at NYS Board of Elections

200
2013 politics in New York (state)
2014 politics in New York (state)
Independent Democratic Conference
2013 U.S. legislative sessions
2014 U.S. legislative sessions